Two ships have borne the name HMS Jed.

  was a  launched in 1904 and laid up in 1919.
  was a  launched in 1942, placed in reserve in 1946 and broken up in 1957.

Royal Navy ship names